Fabian Holzer (born 28 July 1992) is a German badminton player. In 2011, he won the silver medal in the boys' doubles event at the European Junior Championships partnered with Max Schwenger, and in 2016, he won the men's doubles title at the Brazil Open Grand Prix tournament with Michael Fuchs.

Achievements

European Junior Championships 
Boys' doubles

BWF Grand Prix 
The BWF Grand Prix had two levels, the Grand Prix and Grand Prix Gold. It was a series of badminton tournaments sanctioned by the Badminton World Federation (BWF) and played between 2007 and 2017.

Men's doubles

  BWF Grand Prix Gold tournament
  BWF Grand Prix tournament

References

External links 
 

1992 births
Living people
People from Dachau
Sportspeople from Upper Bavaria
German male badminton players